Handbook of Mathematical Functions may refer to:

NBS Handbook of Mathematical Functions (with Formulas, Graphs, and Mathematical Tables) aka Abramowitz and Stegun, a mathematical textbook published in 1964
NIST Handbook of Mathematical Functions, the successor mathematical textbook published in 2010